Doña Juana is a stratovolcano, located within the Doña Juana-Cascabel Volcanic Complex  National Natural Park in Nariño, Colombia.

With a previous eruption of VEI 4, Doña Juana is rated as a "large" volcano of "cataclysmic" destructive power. During its last eruption, in 1906, more than 100 people were killed and many houses were destroyed.

Its largest known historical eruption was on November 13, 1899. In its prehistory, it is known to have erupted in the 23rd century BC in a caldera-forming eruption of unknown magnitude.



Etymology 
The name of the volcano originated from a legend of the Chincha Indians, within whose native lands it is located: Mama Juana, a beautiful Quiteña, fell in love with Pedro, a commoner, but with the parents opposed to the marriage, they fled, becoming the victims of a curse that turned them into volcanoes.

Biodiversity 

The volcano can be ascended from a slope that is part of the so-called Valley of Orchids. It is surrounded by an area of extraordinary biodiversity, which includes 471 species of birds (the Andean condor included), bears, deer and pumas.

The summit of Dona Juana consists of a number of peaks, which afford a number of views, including of Laguna del Silencio, one of 42 lakes in the national park. The Petacas is located to the northeast of Doña Juana. Both volcanoes are located between the El Tablón Fault in the west and the San Jerónimo Fault in the east.

Gallery

See also 
 List of volcanoes in Colombia
 List of volcanoes by elevation

References

Bibliography 
 

Andean Volcanic Belt
Mountains of Colombia
Stratovolcanoes of Colombia
Quaternary South America
Quaternary volcanoes
20th-century volcanic events
Geography of Nariño Department
Four-thousanders of the Andes